Lentini (historically Liuntini;) is a town and  in the Province of Syracuse, southeastern Sicily (Southern Italy).

History
The city was founded by colonists from Naxos as Leontini in 729 BC, which in its beginnings was a Chalcidian colony established five years earlier.

It is virtually the only Greek settlement in Sicily that is not located on the coast, founded around 10 km inland. The site, originally held by the Sicels, was seized by the Greeks owing to their command on the fertile plain in the north. The city was reduced to subject status in 494 BC by Hippocrates of Gela, who made his ally Aenesidemus its tyrant. In 476 BC, Hieron of Syracuse moved the inhabitants from Catana and Naxos to Leontini.

Later on, the city of Leontini regained its independence. However, as a part of the inhabitants efforts to retain their independence, they invoked more than once the interventions of Athens. It was mainly the eloquence of Gorgias of Leontini which led to the abortive Athenian expedition of 427 BC.

In 422 BC, the Greek city-state of Syracuse supported the oligarchs against the people and received them as citizens, Leontini itself being forsaken. This led to a renewed Athenian intervention. Initially as a diplomatic one, the exiles of Leontini joined the envoys of Segesta in persuading Athens to undertake the great Sicilian Expedition of 415 BC.

After the failure of the Expedition, Leontini became subject to Syracuse once more. The city's independence was guaranteed by the treaty of 405 BC between Dionysius and the Carthaginians, but it was soon lost again. The city was finally stormed by Marcus Claudius Marcellus in 214 BC.

In Roman times it seems to have been of small importance. It was destroyed by the Saracens in 847 AD, and almost completely ruined by the earthquake of 1693.

The ancient city is described by Polybius as lying in a valley between two hills, and facing north. On the western side of this valley there was a river flowing with a row of houses on its western bank below the hill. At each end was a gate, the northern gate leading to the plain, the southern, at the upper end, leading to Syracuse. On each side of the valley there was an acropolis, lying between precipitous hills with flat tops, over which buildings extended. The eastern hill still has the remains of a strongly fortified medieval castle, in which some writers are inclined (though wrongly) to recognize portions of the Greek masonry.

Excavations were made in 1899 in one of the ravines in a Sicel necropolis of the third period; explorations in the various Greek cemeteries resulted in the discovery of some fine bronzes, notably a lebes.

Main sights

Lentini's sights include:
Santa Maria la Cava e Sant'Alfio: Chiesa Madre ("Mother Church of St Mary of the Cave and St Alphius"): Baroque church built after the 1693 earthquake by Vincenzo Vella of Malta. It has a basilica plan with three naves; the three-order facade is from the 18th century. The central portal has scenes of the martyrdom of Saints Alphius, Philadelphus and Cyrinus. The interior houses a 12th-century Byzantine icon.
Santissima Trinità e San Marziano ("Holy Trinity and St Marcian"): church was built over the ruins of the 16th-century Palazzo La Palumba. It has a noteworthy pavement in ceramic of Caltagirone (18th-century) and a polyptych of Antonello da Messina's school. The high altar tabernacle is made of lapis lazuli.
Chiesa dell'Immacolata ("Church of Mary of the Immaculate Conception"): 17th-century church, which houses  a Romanesque lion sculpture, a Christ at the Column and the tombstone of Queen Mary (1402).
San Luca: (St Luke) church has a canvas depicting St Francis of Assisi, attributed to the school of Bassano and other artworks. Next to the church are the remains of the Castle of Frederick II, the hypogeum of St. Lucy with 14th-century frescoes, the Crucifix Grottoes with frescoes from the 12th–17th centuries and the ruins of the old parish church of San Pietro (16th century).
San Francesco di Paola: 18th-century church with a rare organ and artworks from churches which were destroyed by the 1693 earthquake.
Lago di Lentini or Biviere: lake that extends not far away from the city, once drained but rebuilt in the 1970s in the old location. The lake is rich in vegetation and fauna.

Economy
Lentini's economy is mainly based on agriculture and, to a lesser extent, on woodcraft and handicraft production. The city is also known for the production of the blood orange, specifically the types tarocco, moro, and sanguinella.

Climate
Lentini's climate is Mediterranean, with mild winters and hot summers. During the coldest months, the average temperature during the day is around 15 °C, while the warmest months see average daytime temperatures that reach 34 °C. In summer, temperatures reach 40 °C every year and temperatures over 45 °C are not unheard of. Winter also encounters temperatures over 15 °C yearly, with temperatures over 20 °C also occurring, but less frequently. Occasionally, winter lows go down to 0 °C, but rarely go under 0 °C. Summer lows normally do not go under 17 °C but can occasionally go down to 15 °C. While the climate is relatively dry all year round, there is a marked difference between precipitation days in summer, that experiences rain very rarely, and in winter, where rain occurs more frequently.

People
Gorgias (c. 485 – c. 380 BC), pre-Socratic philosopher.
Giacomo da Lentini, 13th century poet and reputed inventor of the sonnet.
Filadelfo Mugnos (1607–1675), man of letters and author of the Teatro genealogico delle famiglie nobili siciliane, titolate, feudatarie ed antiche del fedelissimo regno di Sicilia viventi ed estinte.
Jeffrey Jey (born 1970), singer and lead vocalist of the group Eiffel 65.

See also
Sicula Leonzio, football club located in Lentini
Blood orange, speciality of Lentini
Sicily, region in which Lentini is located

References

Sources

External links
  

Municipalities of the Province of Syracuse
Euboean colonies of Magna Graecia
720s BC
8th-century BC establishments in Italy
Greek city-states